SparkleShare is an open-source cloud storage and file synchronization client app. By default, it uses Git as a storage backend.  SparkleShare is comparable to Dropbox, but the cloud storage can be provided by the user's own server, or a hosted solution such as GitHub.  Advantage of self-hosting is that the user retains control over their data. In the simplest case, self-hosting only requires SSH and Git. SparkleShare's support for both Android and iOS devices is on hold due to the lack of developer resources.

See also 

 Comparison of file hosting services
 Comparison of file synchronization software
 Comparison of online backup services

References

External links
 
 HOWTO - SparkleShare on Ubuntu

Cloud applications
Data synchronization
Email attachment replacements
File hosting for Linux
File hosting for Windows
File sharing software
Free software programmed in C Sharp
Online backup services